Robinson Hilario (born May 26, 1994) is a professional freestyle and big-air kiteboarder, born and based in the Dominican Republic. He is currently ranked within the Top 15 worldwide.

Early life 
Hilario was born on May 26, 1994, in Sosua, Dominican Republic. From humble beginnings, he began kiting when he was 10 years old when visiting kiters on the beach lent him their equipment. By 16, he became sponsored by F-One and began his professional career competing worldwide

Career 
 2011: 4th overall in PKRA
 2013: 7th overall in PKRA
 2014: 2nd PKRA 2014
 2017 + 2018: 2nd place, DR Open
 2017: Top 11 worldwide; Top 9 GKA Air Games Cabarete
 2018: Member of the Dominican Olympic Federation for Paris 2024

References 

1994 births
Living people
Air racers